Jamides coruscans, the Ceylon cerulean, is a small butterfly endemic to Sri Lanka that belongs to the lycaenids or blues family.

Description
Wingspan is about 25-30 mm. Larval host plant is Humboldtia laurifolia.

References

External links

Jamides
Butterflies of Sri Lanka
Butterflies described in 1877